The Look of Silence ("Silence") is a 2014 internationally co-produced documentary film directed by Joshua Oppenheimer about the Indonesian mass killings of 1965–66. The film is a companion piece to his 2012 documentary The Act of Killing. Executive producers were Werner Herzog, Errol Morris, and Andre Singer. It was nominated for the Academy Award for Best Documentary Feature at the 88th Academy Awards.

Overview
A middle-aged Indonesian man, whose brother was brutally murdered in the 1965 Indonesian Communist Purge, confronts the men who carried out the killings. Out of concern for his safety, the man is not fully identified in the film and is credited only as "anonymous," as are many of the film's crew positions. Some shots consist of the man watching (what seems to be) extra footage from The Act of Killing, which includes video of the men who killed his brother. He visits and interviews some of the killers and their collaborators—including his uncle—under the pretense of an eye exam. Although none of the killers expresses any remorse, the daughter of one of them is clearly shaken when she hears, apparently for the first time, the details of the killings.

Also interspersed, there are scenes of his elderly mother and his almost deaf and blind father.

Release
The film was screened in the official competition at the 71st Venice International Film Festival, where it won the Grand Jury Prize, the International Film Critics Award (FIPRESCI), the Italian online critics award (Mouse d'Oro), the European Film Critics Award (FEDEORA), as well as the Human Rights Nights Award. Since then, it has gone on to win multiple awards, including Best World Documentary (Cinephile Prize) at the Busan International Film Festival, the Grand Prize (DOX Award) at CPH:DOX, the prize for Best Documentary at the Starz Denver Film Festival, a Danish Arts Council Award for outstanding achievement in filmmaking, and the Best Film Award at the One World human rights documentary film festival.

On 10 November 2014, 2,000 people came to the official and public premiere of the film in Jakarta. On 10 December 2014, International Human Rights Day, there were 480 public screenings of the film across Indonesia. The screenings of the film in Indonesia has been sponsored by the National Human Rights Commission of Indonesia and the Jakarta Arts Council.

It was selected for screening in the Berlinale Special Galas section of the 65th Berlin International Film Festival in February 2015.

In February 2016, Oppenheimer, along with Amnesty International and Human Rights Watch, screened the film for members of the Senate Foreign Relations Committee and their House counterparts, officials from the Department of State, and members of the White House National Security Council staff. Oppenheimer hoped the Oscar buzz the film was generating would pressure the US government to formally acknowledge its collusion in the killings.

After its theatrical release, the film aired on US television as part of the PBS series POV.

Reception

Critical response 
The Look of Silence received critical acclaim. On review aggregator website Rotten Tomatoes, the film holds a 96% approval rating, and an average rating of 8.8/10, based on 136 reviews. The website's critical consensus states, "The Look of Silence delivers a less shocking – yet just as terribly compelling – companion piece to Joshua Oppenheimer's The Act of Killing". On Metacritic, the film has a 92 out of 100 rating based on 29 critics, indicating "universal acclaim". On 14 January 2016, the film was nominated for the Academy Award for Best Documentary Feature.

Awards and nominations 
As of March 2016, The Look of Silence  has won 70 international awards, including the following:

References

External links
 
 
 
 
 
 The Look of Silence at POV

2014 documentary films
2014 films
American documentary films
American sequel films
British documentary films
British sequel films
Danish documentary films
Danish sequel films
Documentary films about the Indonesian mass killings of 1965–1966
Dutch documentary films
Dutch sequel films
Films set in Indonesia
Films set in the 1960s
Films shot in Indonesia
Finnish documentary films
Finnish sequel films
French sequel films
German documentary films
German sequel films
Indonesian documentary films
Indonesian sequel films
2010s Indonesian-language films
Israeli documentary films
Israeli sequel films
Plaion
Norwegian documentary films
Norwegian sequel films
Venice Grand Jury Prize winners
Best Documentary Bodil Award winners
Best Documentary Robert Award winners
2010s American films
2010s British films
2010s German films